Krewson is a surname. Notable people with the surname include:

 Jim Krewson, singer and guitarist of Jim & Jennie and the Pinetops
Justin Krewson (born 1996), American luger
Lyda Krewson (born 1953), American politician
Rollie Krewson, American puppet designer active mid-1970s–present